"You're Gonna Ruin My Bad Reputation" is a song written by Jeff Crossan, and recorded by American country music artist Ronnie McDowell.  It was released in May 1983 as the second single from the album Personally.  The song was McDowell's second and final number one on the country chart.  The single went to number one for a single week and spent twenty-two weeks on the country chart.

Charts

Weekly charts

Year-end charts

References

1983 singles
1983 songs
Ronnie McDowell songs
Song recordings produced by Buddy Killen
Epic Records singles